The 2012 Superstars Series Donington round was the third round of the 2012 Superstars Series season. It took place on 20 May at Donington Park.

Gianni Morbidelli won both races, driving an Audi RS5.

Classification

Qualifying

Race 1

Race 2

Notes:
 – Andrea Larini was given a 25-second penalty for having a pit stop under the Safety Car.
 – Sandro Bettini was given a 25-second penalty for causing a collision with Mauro Cesari.

Standings after the event

International Series standings

Teams' Championship standings

 Note: Only the top five positions are included for both sets of drivers' standings.

References

Superstars
Superstars Series seasons